Party of the People may refer to:

Party of the People (Burundi)
Party of the People (Chile)
Party of the People of Free Indonesia
Partido de la Gente (Party of the People), Uruguay

See also
People's Party (disambiguation)